Made in Cleveland (formerly titled Cleveland, I Love You) is a 2013 anthology film consisting of 11 short films featuring the work of seven different directors and five screenwriters. The short films all relate in some way to the subject of life, love, and the pursuit of happiness in Cleveland, Ohio.  The film was written, directed, produced largely by people with connections to Cleveland, and it stars a cast and crew consisting predominantly of current or former Clevelanders, including Shaker Heights native Jamie Babbit and Cleveland natives Eric Swinderman and Robert C. Banks, Jr. The film stars an ensemble cast, among them Busy Philipps, Gillian Jacobs, George Roth, Jeffrey Grover, Robin Swoboda, Leon Bibb, Brendan Potter, Derek Koger, Linda Ryan, Robbie Barnes, Charlie Martini, and others. Made in Cleveland premiered June 13, 2013 at the historic Atlas Cinemas Lakeshore 7 theater in Euclid, Ohio. It opened June 21 in five Atlas Cinemas theaters in Ohio, and was well reviewed in the local press. Made in Cleveland will be released by its distributor, Striped Entertainment, in additional select cities in the United States in Summer 2013.

Cast and crew
Following is the full cast and crew of eleven segments of Cleveland, I Love You

References

1. Cleveland Scene Magazine, August, 2012
2. The Celebrity Cafe: Busy Philipps
3. Cinema Blend: Gillian Jacobs, Community
4. Trailer Bites, Three Star Reviews
5. Midwest Movie Maker Magazine, February, 2012
6. Midwest Movie Maker Magazine, January, 2012
7. Midwest Movie Maker Magazine, January, 2012

External links
 
 

Films set in Cleveland
Films shot in Cleveland
American anthology films
2012 films